Richard Johns (born October 23, 1981) is an American professional race car driver from Lawrenceville, Georgia. He is currently racing in the Georgia Asphalt Series and the Camping World East Series. Johns also works as an engineering consultant for several teams in NASCAR.

Pre-NASCAR
Johns began racing in go-karts at the age of nine, Johns spent time on the go-kart dirt tracks throughout Georgia and the southeast. Moving up, he competed in the PARTS, the GAS and the ARCA RE/MAX Series. Along the way, Johns met Bobby Hamilton, who would be his mentor throughout his career.

Entry into NASCAR
Johns attended the University of North Carolina at Charlotte while an employee at Team Rensi Motorsports. He graduated UNC-Charlotte with a Bachelor of Science in Mechanical Engineering. At the same time, he was promoted to Rensi's head engineer. In 2007, Rensi turned to Johns in driving their #25 car to fill in for NEXTEL Cup driver David Gilliland when his Cup and Busch schedule conflicted in 15 races, sponsored by freecreditreport.com. Johns had two top-twenty finishes and ended the season with a 44th-place finish in points. Losing not only both sponsors but Gilliland as well, who had mutually left due to the struggles of Yates Racing, Team Rensi downsized to a one team operation. During the offseason, Johns left Team Rensi and signed a sponsorship deal with family internet portal havfun.com. He and havfun were to compete in the Craftsman Truck Series for Wyler Racing in 2008, but the sponsor money never materialized and the deal fell through before Speedweeks, leaving Johns without a ride.

Motorsports career results

NASCAR
(key) (Bold – Pole position awarded by qualifying time. Italics – Pole position earned by points standings or practice time. * – Most laps led.)

Busch Series

Craftsman Truck Series

ARCA Re/Max Series
(key) (Bold – Pole position awarded by qualifying time. Italics – Pole position earned by points standings or practice time. * – Most laps led.)

References

External links
 Official Website
 

ARCA Menards Series drivers
Living people
NASCAR drivers
People from Lawrenceville, Georgia
University of North Carolina at Charlotte alumni
Racing drivers from Atlanta
Racing drivers from Georgia (U.S. state)
1981 births
Sportspeople from the Atlanta metropolitan area